Nicos Nicolaou (born August 5, 1973 in Limassol, Cyprus) is a Cypriot manager and former player, best known for his years with Anorthosis. Nicolaou retired from professional football at the end of the season 2008-2009, and immediately was added to the coaching stuff as assistant coach. On 18 February 2010, he was announced as first coach of the team until the end of the season.

References

External links

1973 births
Living people
Cypriot footballers
Cyprus international footballers
Anorthosis Famagusta F.C. players
Nea Salamis Famagusta FC players
Cypriot First Division players
Association football midfielders
Cypriot football managers